Dealey is a surname. Notable people with the surname include:

Edward Musgrove Dealey (1892–1969), American journalist and publisher
George Bannerman Dealey (1859–1946), American businessman and publisher of The Dallas Morning News
Sam Dealey, American journalist
Samuel David Dealey (1906–1944), American submarine commanding officer during World War II